The Phoenix Mustangs were a professional minor league ice hockey team in the West Coast Hockey League (WCHL). The Mustangs played at the Arizona Veterans Memorial Coliseum on the grounds of the Arizona State Fair, from the 1997–98 season through the 2000–01 season. The Mustangs came into existence after the demise of the International Hockey League's Phoenix Roadrunners who lost funding from a local Indian community and ceased operations after the 1996–97 season. Their arrival rekindled a decades long rivalry between Phoenix and San Diego based teams in several minor leagues.

The Mustangs were quite successful on the ice their first three seasons, including winning the WCHL's Taylor Cup Championship in 2000 with a four-game sweep of the Tacoma Sabercats, with an exciting sudden-death overtime victory at the Coliseum in game four. The Mustangs were not so blessed the following season, finishing last in their final season in 2000–01. The Mustangs were unable to secure a new lease with the Coliseum for the 2001–02 season and were forced to cease operations.

Season-by-season record 
Note: GP = Games played, W = Wins, L = Losses, OTL = Overtime losses, SOL = Shootout losses, Pts = Points, GF = Goals for, GA = Goals against, PIM = Penalties in minutes
Final records.

All-Time Roster

References

External links 
 Phoenix Mustangs Mustangs historical site
 game photos by Jennifer Rosevear

Ice hockey teams in Arizona
Ice hockey clubs established in 1997
Sports clubs disestablished in 2001
Sports in Phoenix, Arizona
West Coast Hockey League teams